The New York International Piano Competition (NYIPC) in New York City is a biennial piano competition open to pianists of all nationalities ages 16–21. No contestant is eliminated during the competition's four rounds. A cash award is also presented to each of the contestants not receiving a major prize. The NYIPC has been held at the Manhattan School of Music since its inception in 2002, with opening ceremonies at Steinway Hall. Steinway and Sons is the official piano of the competition.

Rather than a traditional competition model where the focus is on winning, the NYIPC provides an opportunity for contestants to perform, network, exchange information, and cultivate a support system that will sustain them through their pre-professional years. Former NYIPC prizewinners perform with Chamber Music Society Two; have received the Avery Fisher Career Grant; the Gilmore Young Artist Award; The Juilliard School's William Petschek Recital Award; the Louis Sudler Prize in the Arts at Harvard University; have won the Young Concert Artists Auditions, and Concert Artists Guild Victor Elmaleh Competition; and maintain active careers as solo performers, collaborative pianists, composers, and pedagogues.

History 
Sponsored by the Stecher and Horowitz Foundation, the competition was instituted in 2002 as an outgrowth of the Stecher and Horowitz School of the Arts in Cedarhurst, New York. The competition was originally open to American pianists, citizen-born, naturalized or full-time international students with student visas, ages 14–18. In 2009, the competition began to accept applications worldwide, effective the summer of 2010; it also expanded its age category upwards from 14–18 years to 16–21 years.

Prizes
The current NYIPC prizes, totaling $50,000, are:

 First Prize: $10,000
 Second Prize: $6,000
 Third Prize: $3,000
 Fourth Prize: $2,000
 Ensemble Prizes: $6,000
 Best performance of commissioned work: $1,500

$1,000 is awarded to each of the remaining contestants.

The Young Artist Series 
Winners of the NYIPC are awarded concert and recital appearances through the Stecher and Horowitz Foundation's Young Artists Series. They regularly appear at venues in New York, Connecticut, and Washington, D.C. including: Congregation Emanu-El of New York, NYC; Park Avenue Christian Church, NYC; The Bohemians, NYC; Salmagundi Club, NYC; Subculture Arts Underground, NYC; Downtown Music at Grace, White Plains, NY; Ossining Public Library, Ossining, NY; Canisius College, Buffalo, NY; Fairfield University, Fairfield, CT; Phillips Collection, Washington, D.C.; Church of the Annunciation, Washington, D.C.

Works Commissioned for the NYIPC 
Since 2006, the Stecher and Horowitz Foundation has commissioned a new solo piano work for each competition. All contestants are required to perform the piece from memory as part of their Preliminary or Semifinal round.

Commissioned composers have included:
2006 - Michael Torke, Bays of Huatulco (renamed Blue Pacific)
2008 - John Musto, Improvisation and Fugue
2010 - No work commissioned
2012 - Avner Dorman, Three Etudes
2014 - Gabriela Lena Frank, Nocturno Nazqueño
2016 - Lowell Liebermann, Two Impromptus
2018 - Gregory Spears, Toccata (Troika)

Laureates

References

External links 
 official website

Piano competitions in the United States
Organizations based in New York (state)
Culture of New York City
2002 establishments in New York City
Recurring events established in 2002